Simon Mark Aiken is Dean of Benoni and rector of St Dunstan's Cathedral in the Diocese of the Highveld. He was previously the 12th Dean of Kimberley and rector of St Cyprian's Cathedral, Kimberley, in the Diocese of Kimberley and Kuruman in South Africa. Born in England in 1962, he went to South Africa in 2006, initially as subdean at Bloemfontein Cathedral.

Early career 

Aiken qualified with a Master of Theology degree from St Andrew's University (1985) and a Certificate in Theology from Ripon College Cuddesdon, Oxford (1986-1988).

He was made a deacon (1988) and ordained as a priest (1989) in the Diocese of Blackburn.

Aiken served curacies, 1988-1994, at St Matthew with Holy Trinity, Burnley, and St Anne’s at St Annes-on-Sea. Subsequently he was vicar respectively at St Thomas the Apostle, Musbury, Helmshore (1994-1999), and at St Lawrence with St Paul, Longridge, north east of the city of Preston (1999-2006).

An early interest in liturgy led Aiken to researching and revising the compline rite for his theological college and to subsequent engagements in devising liturgies for many contexts and occasions at parish and diocesan levels.

Aiken became involved with the Royal School of Church Music both regionally and at a national level in the United Kingdom, being chaplain for the annual Easter course at Rossall School over a period of 11 years. He is himself a singer and he plays the organ and piano.

South Africa 

Aiken went to South Africa in 2006 to become the subdean at the Cathedral of St Andrew and St Michael in Bloemfontein in the Diocese of the Free State – a diocese having a link relationship with the Diocese of Blackburn.

In 2009 he was invited by Archbishop Thabo Makgoba to be champion for the Anglican Church of Southern Africa’s Liturgical Transformation Task Team.

As in England, Aiken was soon integrating musical endeavours with the theological and liturgical aspects of the life of the cathedral and he was instrumental in forming a new Free State branch of the Royal School of Church Music centred in Bloemfontein. He forged links between the cathedral and academic institutions in the city, formally as Anglican chaplain to the University of the Free State and the Central University of Technology, as well as through the fostering of musical connections.

Aiken enrolled for a PhD at the University of the Free State, to study African liturgical music.

Kimberley Cathedral 

In 2010 Aiken was invited to be Dean of Kimberley and was installed by Oswald Swartz, bishop of the Diocese of Kimberley and Kuruman at St Cyprian's Cathedral on 6 November 2010.

In his first sermon as dean, Aiken quoted Archbishop William Temple to remind his listeners that "the Church is the only cooperative society in the world that exists for the benefit of those who are not its members." He spoke of his vision to nurture a generous and welcoming spirit at the cathedral which serves not just its own parish but also the wider city of Kimberley and the diocese.

Aiken has described himself as being "a very embryonic student of Afrikaans" ("what can I say but 'ek probeer' - I try") while having a more fluent command of Sesotho.

His diocesan responsibilities included appointments as the Archdeacon of the Karoo (2011-2012) and as Titular Rector of St Mary's, Barkly West, as well as his role as Canon Missioner for the diocese and as Vicar General (April 2012).

Benoni 

Aiken was appointed Dean of Benoni in 2014 and was instituted and installed as Dean and Rector at St Dunstan's Cathedral on 25 May 2014. Following the retirement of Bishop David Bannerman at the end of January 2015, Aiken was licensed as Vicar General of the Diocese of the Highveld.

References

External links 

 Sermon by the Very Revd Fr Simon Aiken, Dean of Kimberley, St Cyprian's Cathedral
 Homily for Ash Wednesday, 9 March 2011, St Cyprian's Cathedral
 Easter Sermon, 24 April 2011, St Cyprian's Cathedral - with images from the Easter Monday Ordination and Chrism Mass
 Archdeacon's Charge, St Cyprian's Cathedral, 8 May 2011
 "Treasure within" - sermon by the Dean of Kimberley, 24 July 2011
 "Remembrance Sunday" - sermon by the Dean of Kimberley, 13 November 2011
 Christmas Midnight Mass - The Word was made Flesh and Dwelt among Us, 25 December 2011
 Sermon for Candlemas, 2012 - The Very Revd Fr Simon Aiken, Dean of Kimberley, 29 January 2012
 Sermon for Lent II, 2012 - The Very Revd Fr Simon Aiken, Dean of Kimberley, 4 March 2012
 Sermon for Lent V, 'The Hour of Glory: Bearing much Fruit' by The Very Revd Fr Simon Aiken, Dean of Kimberley, 25 March 2012
 Archdeacon's Charge, 2012, 'A faith worth sharing - a Church worth joining' by the Very Revd Fr Simon Aiken, Dean of Kimberley, Archdeacon of the Karoo, and Canon Missioner to the Diocese, 25 March 2012
 Easter Sermon 2012: 'Noli me tangere - Do not touch me' by the Very Revd Fr Simon Aiken, Dean of Kimberley and Canon Missioner to the Diocese, 8 April 2012
 The Dean's sermon on 13 May 2012 - 104th anniversary of the dedication of St Cyprian's Cathedral
 Corpus Christi 2012 - The Dean's Sermon, 10 June 2012
 Sermon on St Mark 6:14-29 - by the Very Revd Fr Simon Aiken, 15 July 2012
 Sermon for the Feast of the Transfiguration - the Very Revd Fr Simon Aiken, 5 August 2012
 Sermon by the Dean - 'Therefore take up the armour of God' (Ephesians 6:10-20), 26 August 2012
 Sermon by the Dean - Embracing both the insider and the outsider (Isaiah 35:4-7a; James 2:1-10,14-17; St Mark 7:24-37), 9 September 2012
 The Dean's Patronal Festival Sermon, St Cyprian, 16 September 2012
 Remembrance Sunday 2012, Sermon by the Dean, The Very Revd Simon Aiken, Honorary Chaplain to the Kimberley Regiment
 The Baptism of Christ, 13 January 2013: The Dean's Sermon
 Dean's Vestry Address 17 March 2013
 Easter 2013: the Dean's Sermon 31 March 2013
 Sermon for Trinity IV 23 June 2013
 Remembrance Sunday 10 November 2013 - Sermon by the Very Revd Fr Simon Aiken, Dean and Chaplain to the Kimberley Regiment
 'You are the salt of the earth' - sermon for the fourth Sunday before Lent 9 February 2014

Deans of Kimberley
21st-century South African Anglican priests
Living people
Alumni of Ripon College Cuddesdon
Year of birth missing (living people)